Kusjes (English: Kisses) is the ninth studio album by the Belgian music trio K3. The album was released on 19 October 2007 through label Studio 100. It reached the top five in both the Flemish and Dutch album charts. Two singles were released to promote the album: "Kusjesdag" and "Je mama ziet je graag". This was the last album to feature Kathleen Aerts.

Track listing

Personnel
Credits for Kusjes adapted from fan site.

 Kathleen Aerts – vocals
 Children's choir (Charlotte, Laure, Dorien, Charlotte, Lisa, Kiara, Marie-Hélène and Charlotte) – vocals (background)
 Karen Damen – vocals
 Peter Gillis – text, music, production, drums, programming
 Dieter Limbourg – saxophone
 Carlo Mertens – trombone
 Vincent Pierins – bass
 Serge Plume – trumpet
 Uwe Teichtert – mastering
 Pallieter Van Buggenhout – guitars
 Alain Vande Putte – text, music
 Kristel Verbeke – vocals
 Miguel Wiels – text, music, production, keyboards

Chart performance

Weekly charts

Year-end charts

Certifications

References

2007 albums
K3 (band) albums